Salud is a surname. Notable people with the surname include:

Rudy Salud (1938–2011), Filipino boxing manager and commissioner of the Philippine Basketball Association from 1988 to 1992 
Chito Salud (born 1968), current commissioner of the Philippine Basketball Association and son of Rudy Salud.